"Back to You" is a single by American R&B/gospel duo Mary Mary. This is Mary Mary's first song in four years since 2012 single "Go Get It". The song was released on July 21, 2016 for the 2016 film remake of Ben-Hur. The song was written and produced by Warryn Campbell.

Music video
The official music video was released on Mary Mary's second YouTube account on July 21, 2016.

Promotion
On July 22, 2016, Mary Mary performed the song on The Preachers.

References

2016 songs
Mary Mary songs
2016 singles
Songs written by Warryn Campbell